Lauri Valonen (28 November 1909 – 2 October 1982) was a Finnish nordic combined skier who competed in the 1930s. He won a silver medal in the individual event at the 1935 FIS Nordic World Ski Championships in Vysoké Tatry.

Valonen also finished 4th in the individual event at the 1936 Winter Olympics in Garmisch-Partenkirchen.

References

External links

1909 births
1982 deaths
Finnish male Nordic combined skiers
Nordic combined skiers at the 1936 Winter Olympics
Pesäpallo players
FIS Nordic World Ski Championships medalists in Nordic combined
Olympic Nordic combined skiers of Finland
Finnish male ski jumpers
Olympic ski jumpers of Finland
Ski jumpers at the 1936 Winter Olympics
20th-century Finnish people